SS Jonathan Elmer was a Liberty ship built in the United States during World War II. She was named after Jonathan Elmer, an American politician and delegate to the Continental Congress three times: 1777 to 1778, 1781 to 1783, and 1787 to 1788. In 1780 and 1784 he represented Cumberland County in the New Jersey Legislative Council. The College of New Jersey (now known as Princeton University) made Elmer a trustee in 1782. He served in that position until 1795. The New Jersey Legislature appointed Elmer to the United States Senate for the term of 4 March 1789 to 3 March 1791.

Construction
Jonathan Elmer was laid down on 11 July 1942, under a Maritime Commission (MARCOM) contract, MCE hull 308, by the Bethlehem-Fairfield Shipyard, Baltimore, Maryland; she was sponsored by Mrs. Tanya Fettweis, the wife a yard employee, and was launched on 31 August 1942.

History
She was allocated to Marine Transport Lines, Inc., on 14 September 1942. On 13 May 1946, she was laid up in the James River Reserve Fleet, Lee Hall, Virginia. On 18 September 1958, she was sold for scrapping to Bethlehem Steel Co., for $76,191. She was removed from the fleet on 2 February 1960.

References

Bibliography

 
 
 
 

 

Liberty ships
Ships built in Baltimore
1942 ships
James River Reserve Fleet